Isabel Grevelt (born 11 April 2002) is a Dutch allround speed skater.

Career
Grevelt won the 500 m gold medal at the 2020 Winter Youth Olympics which took place at Lake St. Moritz in St. Moritz, Switzerland .

On 30 October 2022 she qualified for the ISU Speed Skating World Cup series after finishing fifth at the 1000 m during the national qualification tournament. She made her World Cup debut in the 1000 m B-division at the Sørmarka Arena in Stavanger, Norway and won the race, resulting in a promotion to the A-division. At the second World Cup event, held at the Thialf in Heerenveen, she finished in third place, behind Jutta Leerdam and Miho Takagi, in a personal record of 1:14.54.

Personal records

References

External links
 

2002 births
Living people
Dutch female speed skaters
21st-century Dutch women
Speed skaters at the 2020 Winter Youth Olympics